Courtenay Dempsey (born 28 August 1987) is a former professional Australian rules footballer who played for the Essendon Football Club in the Australian Football League (AFL).

Early life
Dempsey was born in Mount Isa and has Indigenous Australian heritage and his ancestry can be traced to the Kalkadoon, a tribe from Queensland's South/Central West region.

Dempsey's first sport was rugby league which he played as a junior before trying Aussie Rules in Cairns.

He played with the Manunda Hawks in the AFL Cairns competition. He later moved to Brisbane to play with the Kenmore Bears junior football club while also playing for his school Brisbane Boys' College.

AFL career
Dempsey's professional footballing career has been dogged by injuries.  In 2008 he suffered a leg stress fracture and in 2011 he tore his knee anterior cruciate ligament (ACL) in round four and needed a knee reconstruction.

In May 2013, he was suspended from the main playing group for breaching team rules, and was forced to train with the VFL team. In August, he tore his hamstring tendon and missed the remainder of the season.

At the conclusion of the 2016 season, he was delisted by Essendon.

Statistics

|- style="background-color: #EAEAEA"
! scope="row" style="text-align:center" | 2006
|  || 15 || 5 || 1 || 0 || 23 || 21 || 44 || 16 || 5 || 0.2 || 0.0 || 4.6 || 4.2 || 8.8 || 3.2 || 1.0
|- 
! scope="row" style="text-align:center" | 2007
|  || 15 || 1 || 1 || 1 || 7 || 5 || 12 || 1 || 1 || 1.0 || 1.0 || 7.0 || 5.0 || 12.0 || 1.0 || 1.0
|- style="background-color: #EAEAEA"
! scope="row" style="text-align:center" | 2008
|  || 15 || 4 || 1 || 1 || 23 || 29 || 52 || 12 || 6 || 0.2 || 0.2 || 5.8 || 7.2 || 13.0 || 3.0 || 1.5
|- 
! scope="row" style="text-align:center" | 2009
|  || 15 || 20 || 7 || 6 || 150 || 169 || 319 || 69 || 46 || 0.4 || 0.3 || 7.5 || 8.4 || 16.0 || 3.4 || 2.3
|- style="background-color: #EAEAEA"
! scope="row" style="text-align:center" | 2010
|  || 15 || 20 || 3 || 8 || 201 || 158 || 359 || 85 || 73 || 0.2 || 0.4 || 10.0 || 7.9 || 18.0 || 4.2 || 3.6
|- 
! scope="row" style="text-align:center" | 2011
|  || 15 || 4 || 0 || 0 || 26 || 24 || 50 || 13 || 10 || 0.0 || 0.0 || 6.5 || 6.0 || 12.5 || 3.2 || 2.5
|- style="background-color: #EAEAEA"
! scope="row" style="text-align:center" | 2012
|  || 15 || 20 || 4 || 0 || 238 || 124 || 362 || 106 || 62 || 0.2 || 0.0 || 11.9 || 6.2 || 18.1 || 5.3 || 3.1
|- 
! scope="row" style="text-align:center" | 2013
|  || 15 || 14 || 7 || 3 || 187 || 69 || 256 || 71 || 40 || 0.5 || 0.2 || 13.4 || 4.9 || 18.3 || 5.1 || 2.9
|- style="background-color: #EAEAEA"
! scope="row" style="text-align:center" | 2014
|  || 15 || 18 || 2 || 3 || 162 || 119 || 281 || 67 || 57 || 0.1 || 0.2 || 9.0 || 6.6 || 15.6 || 3.7 || 3.2
|- 
! scope="row" style="text-align:center" | 2015
|  || 15 || 13 || 5 || 7 || 111 || 61 || 172 || 46 || 25 || 0.4 || 0.5 || 8.5 || 4.7 || 13.2 || 3.5 || 1.9
|- style="background-color: #EAEAEA"
! scope="row" style="text-align:center" | 2016
|  || 15 || 14 || 4 || 6 || 159 || 63 || 222 || 63 || 24 || 0.3 || 0.4 || 11.4 || 4.5 || 15.9 || 4.5 || 1.7
|- class="sortbottom"
! colspan=3| Career
! 133
! 35
! 35
! 1287
! 842
! 2129
! 549
! 349
! 0.3
! 0.3
! 9.7
! 6.3
! 16.0
! 4.1
! 2.6
|}

References

External links

Essendon Football Club players
Morningside Australian Football Club players
1987 births
Living people
Indigenous Australian players of Australian rules football
People educated at Brisbane Boys' College
Australian rules footballers from Queensland
Palmerston Football Club players
Bendigo Football Club players
Greenvale Football Club players